Gantang is a rural town in Jingzhou Miao and Dong Autonomous County, Hunan, China. Miao and Dong people account for 86.7% of the total population in the town. It has the reputation of "granary" and "fruit town" in Jingzhou County. It is surrounded by Shaxi Township on the north, Taiyangping Township on the west, Wenxi Township on the east, and Quyang Town on the south.

History
After the founding of the Communist State in 1950, Gantang Township was established. In 1958 it was renamed "Gantang People's Commune". In 1984 it was upgraded to a town.

Administrative division
As of 2017, the town is divided into 17 villages: Hongguang, Xikou, Pingyuan, Liaoyuan, Tangtou, Diling, Tiandi, Gaofeng, Gupo, Lequn, Longfeng, Jianguo, Daqiao, Zhaixing, Shamu, Shanmen, Nongchang, and one community: Gantang Community.

Geography
There are two reservoirs in the town: Diling Reservoir and Shuita'ao Reservoir.

The Qushui River passes through the western town.

Economy
The town's economy is based on nearby mineral resources and agricultural resources. Mineral resources are mainly gold, coal and bauxite. Township enterprises are mainly building materials.

Transportation
The G65 Baotou–Maoming Expressway is a north-south highway in the town.

The town is connected to the Jiaozuo–Liuzhou railway.

References

Towns of Huaihua
Jingzhou Miao and Dong Autonomous County